Cyngen ap Cadell (English: Cyngen son of Cadell) or also (Concenn), was King of Powys from 808 until his death in 854 during a pilgrimage to Rome.

Biography
Cyngen was of the line of Brochwel Ysgithrog, and, after a long reign as king of Powys, he went on a pilgrimage to Rome and died there in 854. He is thought to be the first Welsh ruler to visit Rome after the healing of the breach between the Welsh branch of the Celtic Church and Rome over the date of Easter.

Cyngen raised a pillar, originally a round-shafted cross, in memory of his great-grandfather Elisedd ap Gwylog which stands near the later abbey of Valle Crucis. This memorial had a lengthy inscription and is known as the Pillar of Eliseg owing to a typographical mistake by the original carver.

Cyngen was the last of the original line of kings of Powys. He had three sons, but on his death Powys was annexed by Rhodri Mawr, ruler of Gwynedd. Certain later manuscript pedigrees (like Jesus College 20) claim that Rhodri was the son of Cyngen's sister, Nest ferch Cadell, although others (like Mostyn 117) claim he was the son of Essyllt ferch Cynan (thought to be the daughter of Cynan Dindaethwy, of Gwynedd). In any case, traditional Welsh law does not seem to allow female inheritance, so Rhodri is presumed to have taken Powys by conquest.

Cyngen had the following children:

 Elisedd ap Cyngen
 Ieuaf ap Cyngen
 Aeddan ap Cyngen
 Gruffydd ap Cyngen

See also
Kings of Wales family trees

Notes

References

790 births
854 deaths
Year of birth uncertain
Monarchs of Powys
House of Gwertherion
9th-century Welsh monarchs